The Guitar Mongoloid is a 2004 Swedish drama film directed by Ruben Östlund, about different people living outside the norms in the fictional city Jöteborg, strikingly similar to real-life Göteborg. Although not a documentary, most of the people seen in the film are non-actors more or less playing themselves.

Selected cast
 Erik Rutström as Erik
 Ola Sandstig as Ola
 Britt-Marie Andersson as neurotic woman
 Julia Persdotter as Ola's girlfriend
 P-A Emanuelsson
 Anna Johansson
 Mikael Allu
 Bjarne Gunnarsson
 Pär Berg
 David Olandersson

Reception
The film was met by mixed but overall positive reviews, with a rating of 3.6 out of 5 based on eight reviews at the Swedish-language review aggregator website Kritiker.se. Carl-Johan Malmberg at Svenska Dagbladet gave it 5 out of 6 and called it "a series of sabotages: against our expectations, against good taste, as well as against the boredom of the normal Swedish film with its moderately thoughtful, moderately funny, moderately empathetic, and quickly forgotten stories." Jens Peterson at Aftonbladet was less enthusiastic and rated the film 2 out of 5, summarising it as "Jackass without heart, Candid Camera without humour." The film was honored with the FIPRESCI Award at the 27th Moscow International Film Festival.

References

External links 

2004 films
2004 drama films
Swedish drama films
2000s Swedish-language films
Films directed by Ruben Östlund
2000s Swedish films